"Bonfire" is the debut single by American rapper Childish Gambino. It was released on September 17, 2011, as the lead single from his debut studio album, Camp (2011), after its music video was released in July 2011. The song was produced by Gambino and Ludwig Göransson, and debuted on Funkmaster Flex's HOT 97 radio station. 

On August 1, 2017, a remix of "Bonfire" was released by Elijah Who, titled "don't forget to feed your neopets." The remix would later go viral when edited to go along with "cursed images".

Composition
The song opens with Childish Gambino rapping, "OK, it's Childish Gambino, homegirl drop it like the NASDAQ" over a "heavy" beat. In the first verse, he references the video game ToeJam & Earl, rap collective Odd Future, TV series Invader Zim, PETA, clothing brand Band of Outsiders, and fast food chain Jollibee. He also addresses his Asian fetish ("This Asian dude, I stole his girl, and now he got that Kogi beef") and a stereotype of African-Americans in the entertainment industry ("Man, why does every black actor gotta rap some? / I don't know, all I know is I'm the best one").

Critical reception
The song received generally positive reviews from critics. Childish Gambino's vocals in the song have been described as "raspy, aggressive spitting" and similar to Lil Wayne's flow. Singer Billie Eilish has described the song as having "the most hardcore bars I've ever heard".

Music video
A music video for the song was released in July 2011. It begins with Childish Gambino wearing a noose around his neck, and features him in scenes of campfire stories.

Certifications

References

2011 debut singles
2011 songs
Donald Glover songs
Glassnote Records singles
Songs written by Donald Glover
Songs written by Ludwig Göransson